Shattered Glass is a 2003 biographical drama film about journalist Stephen Glass and his scandal at The New Republic. Written and directed by Billy Ray, the film is based on a 1998 Vanity Fair article of the same name by H. G. Bissinger and chronicles Glass's fall from grace when his stories were discovered to be fabricated. It stars Hayden Christensen as Glass, alongside Peter Sarsgaard, Chloë Sevigny, and Steve Zahn.

The film premiered at the 2003 Toronto International Film Festival on September 10, 2003, and received a North American limited release on November 26, 2003. Although a commercial failure, Shattered Glass received acclaim from critics, with particular praise for Christensen and Sarsgaard's performances.

Plot
In 1998, Stephen Glass is an associate editor at The New Republic. Among the youngest of the magazine's staff, Glass enjoys popularity with his colleagues for his entertaining stories. Glass serves under editor Michael Kelly, who holds loyalty with the writers. However, conflict between Kelly and publisher Marty Peretz results in Peretz firing Kelly. Reporter Charles Lane is promoted by Peretz to replace Kelly, despite being disliked by the staff.

Glass writes a story entitled "Hack Heaven" that details a teenage hacker being hired by a large software firm he infiltrated. The story reaches Forbes Digital Tool, where reporter Adam Penenberg finds no corroborating evidence for what Glass described. When contacted by Penenberg about being unable to reach the individuals in his story, Glass provides a number with a Palo Alto area code for the firm. After Lane calls the number, he briefly speaks with an individual identifying as the firm's chairman. Glass and Lane also partake in a conference call with the Forbes staff, which further erodes the story's credibility and prompts Glass to claim he was tricked by his sources.

Lane, looking to protect Glass from the Forbes staff, has Glass take him to a convention center and restaurant where the story took place, but learns both were closed during the events Glass wrote about. With the story contradicted by this information, Glass tells Lane he had only relied on sources for information and falsified his first-hand experiences to improve the story. Lane decides to suspend Glass instead of firing him due to his popularity, but upon discovering Glass's brother lives in Palo Alto, he realizes Glass had his brother pose as the firm's chairman. After confronting Glass with this knowledge, Lane re-reads Glass's previous stories and comes to the revelation they were also falsified. With his deception exposed, Glass is fired by Lane.

Despite initial pushback, Lane receives support from The New Republic staff for bringing Glass's deception to light, while the magazine's attorney questions Glass over which stories of his were fabricated. Closing titles reveal Penenberg's article on Glass was hailed as a breakthrough for internet journalism, The New Republic determined 27 of Glass's 41 stories were either partially or completely fabricated, Kelly was killed while covering the Iraq War, Glass earned a Juris Doctor degree from Georgetown and wrote a novel paralleling his own life, and Lane joined The Washington Post.

Cast

Caroline Goodall portrays Highland Park High School teacher Mrs. Duke in the classroom sequences imagined by Glass. Louis Philippe Dandenault, Morgan Kelly, Christian Tessier, James Berlingieri, and Brett Watson appear as the Young Republicans described in one of Glass's stories. In Glass's depiction of "Hack Heaven", Owen Roth plays Ian Restil, Bill Rowat plays George Sims, Michele Scarabelli plays Ian's mother, and Terry Simpson plays Joe Hiert. Alec Shumpert, a fictional associate editor at George, is played by Andrew Airlie. Mark Camacho appears as Glass's attorney and Lynne Adams appears as a companion of Kelly. Making uncredited appearances are Sean Cullen as The New Republic's attorney and the film's editor Jeffrey Ford as the voice of a security guard at the magazine's office.

Production
Producer Craig Baumgarten, working with HBO executive Gaye Hirsch, optioned H.G. Bissinger's Vanity Fair magazine article about Stephen Glass for an HBO original movie. They hired screenwriter Billy Ray based on the script he had written for the TNT film Legalese. Ray grew up with Bob Woodward and Carl Bernstein as his heroes and studied journalism for a year. It was this love for journalism that motivated him to make Shattered Glass.

A sudden change in management put the film into turnaround and it remained inactive for two years until Cruise/Wagner Productions bought it from HBO. They took it to Lionsgate and Ray asked the studio if he could direct in addition to writing it. The challenge for Ray was to make the subject matter watchable because, according to the filmmaker, "watching people write is deadly dull ... in a film like this, dialogue is what a character is willing to reveal about himself, and the camera is there to capture everything else". The breakthrough for Ray came when he realized that the film's real protagonist was not Glass but Chuck Lane. According to Ray, "as fascinating as Stephen Glass is by the end of the movie people would want to kill themselves – you just can't follow him all the way". He used the Bissinger article as a starting point, which gave him a line of dialogue on which to hook the entire character of Glass: "Are you mad at me?" According to Ray, "you can build an entire character around that notion, and we did".

The character of Caitlin Avey is an amalgamation of Glass's friends and The New Republic allies Hanna Rosin and Jonathan Chait.

To prepare for the film, Ray interviewed and re-interviewed key figures for any relevant details. He signed some of them as paid consultants and gave several approval over the script. Early on, he spent a considerable amount of time trying to earn the trust of the people who had worked with Glass and get them to understand that he was going to be objective with the subject matter. The real Michael Kelly was so unhappy about how he was portrayed in Bissinger's article that he threatened to sue when Ray first contacted him about the film and refused for two years to read Ray's script, which he eventually approved. Ray attempted to contact Glass through his lawyers but was unsuccessful. Lionsgate lawyers asked Ray to give them an annotated script where he had to footnote every line of dialogue and every assertion and back them up with corresponding notes.

The night before principal photography began in Montreal, Ray screened All the President's Men for the cast and crew. He shot both halves of the film differently – in the first half, he used hand-held cameras in the scenes that took place in the offices of The New Republic, but when the Forbes editors begin to question Glass, the camerawork was more stable.

Ray's original cut of the film was a much more straightforward account of events, but became dissatisfied while editing the film and raised additional funds to shoot the high school scenes that bookend the film.

On April 3, 2003, a little more than six months before the film was released, Michael Kelly was killed while reporting on the invasion of Iraq. The film is dedicated to his memory.

Release
Shattered Glass premiered at the Toronto International Film Festival and was shown at the Telluride Film Festival, the Boston Film Festival, the Woodstock Film Festival, the Mill Valley Film Festival, and the Austin Film Festival before opening on eight screens in New York City and Los Angeles on October 31, 2003. It grossed $77,540 on its opening weekend. It eventually earned $2,220,008 in North America and $724,744 in other  markets for a total worldwide box office of $2,944,752.

Critical reception
The film received positive reviews from critics. On Rotten Tomatoes, the film has a 92% "Certified Fresh" rating, based on 168 reviews, with an average rating of 7.70/10. The site's consensus states: "A compelling look at Stephen Glass' fall from grace." On Metacritic, the film has a score of 73 out of 100, based on 38 critics, indicating "generally favorable reviews".

A. O. Scott of The New York Times described the film as "a serious, well-observed examination of the practice of journalism," and "an astute and surprisingly gripping drama." He added, "A more showily ambitious film might have tried to delve into Glass's personal history in search of an explanation for his behavior, or to draw provocative connections between that behavior and the cultural and political climate of the times. Such a movie would also have been conventional, facile and ultimately false. Mr. Ray knows better than to sensationalize a story about the dangers of sensationalism. Shattered Glass is good enough to be true". Roger Ebert of the Chicago Sun-Times gave the film three-and-a-half stars out of four and felt the film was well-cast and "deserves comparison with All the President's Men among movies about journalism". In a dissenting review from The Village Voice, J. Hoberman dismissed the film as "self-important yet insipid," and asks, "Shattered Glass begs a larger question: What sort of culture elevates Glass for his entertainment value, punishes him for being too entertaining, rewards his notoriety, and then resurrects him again as a moral object lesson?"

Sarsgaard's performance as Charles Lane was singled out by several critics for praise. USA Today gave the film three-and-a-half stars out of four and wrote of him: "Sarsgaard deserves more credit than he'll probably get for his multi-layered performance". Premieres Glenn Kenny wrote, "it's Peter Sarsgaard, as the editor who serves Glass his , who walks away with the picture, metamorphosing his character's stiffness into a moral indignation that's jolting and, finally, invigorating". His performance ended up winning numerous awards, including "Best Supporting Actor" citations from the Boston Society of Film Critics, Kansas City Film Critics Circle, National Society of Film Critics, Online Film Critics Society, San Francisco Film Critics Circle, and the Toronto Film Critics Association, as well as nominations from the Independent Spirit Awards and the Golden Globes. The A.V. Club placed his portrayal of Chuck Lane at number six on a list of the best performances of the decade.

Stephen Glass saw the film and, when reflecting about the experience, he said, "It was very painful for me. It was like being on a guided tour of the moments of my life I am most ashamed of".

Awards and nominations

References

External links

 
 
 
 
 

2003 films
2003 biographical drama films
2003 directorial debut films
2000s English-language films
American biographical drama films
Biographical films about journalists
Canadian biographical drama films
Cruise/Wagner Productions films
Films based on newspaper and magazine articles
2003 independent films
American independent films
Films directed by Billy Ray
Films scored by Mychael Danna
Films set in the 1990s
Films set in 1997
Films set in 1998
Films set in Illinois
Films set in Manhattan
Films set in Maryland
Films set in offices
Films set in Washington, D.C.
Films shot in Los Angeles
Films shot in Maryland
Films shot in Montreal
Films shot in Washington, D.C.
Films with screenplays by Billy Ray
Journalism ethics
Lionsgate films
The New Republic
Films about journalism
2000s American films
2000s Canadian films